The Men's 800 metre freestyle competition of the 2018 European Aquatics Championships was held on 7 and 8 August 2018.

Records
Before the competition, the existing world and championship records were as follows.

Results

Heats
The heats were started on 7 August at 10:18.

Final
The final was started on 8 August at 16:30.

References

Men's 800 metre freestyle